McRonald Kamaka (March 9, 1937 – July 23, 2007) was an American-Canadian professional wrestler known by the ring name Tor Kamata.  He won several heavyweight and tag team championships, most notably the PWF World Heavyweight Championship in All Japan Pro Wrestling and the AWA World Tag Team Championship in the American Wrestling Association. He was a classic heel, reviled for dirty tricks in the ring, included rubbing salt in his opponent's eyes.

Professional wrestling career
After returning to Hawaii after leaving the United States Air Force, 50th State Big Time Wrestling promoter Ed Francis convinced Kamaka to try professional wrestling. He was given the name Tor Kamata in reference to Tomas De Torquemada of the Spanish Inquisition. He also worked as Mr. Moto, holding the American Wrestling Association's AWA World Tag Team Championship with Mitsu Arakawa.  One of his signature moves, the "judo chop" became a popular phrase for all types of martial arts strikes in the 1960s, even being mentioned by Snoopy in the comic strip "Peanuts" (21 December 1964, 14 January 1967). A generation later, the phrase was satirised in the Austin Powers films.

In the early 1970s, Kamata worked for Stampede Wrestling in Canada, where he held the Stampede North American Heavyweight Championship three times. In the promotion, he feuded with Dan Kroffat.

In 1976 and 1977, Kamata wrestled in the World Wide Wrestling Federation. Managed by Freddie Blassie, he had two memorable matches with Bob Backlund when Backlund was on the brink of becoming the WWWF Champion. In the first, Kamata threw salt into Backlund's eyes, which set the stage for a televised Texas Death match, aired May 7, 1977. Again Kamata threw salt in Backlund's eyes, so Backlund merely used the referee's shirt to wipe it out. Then Backlund delivered an Atomic Knee Drop and won the match. At the time, Superstar Billy Graham had just defeated Bruno Sammartino for the championship and Backlund was being built up as the number one contender.

Personal life
Kamata was an amateur wrestler during high school. He was a club bouncer before becoming a professional wrestler. He joined the United States Air Force and trained with amateur wrestlers in Turkey. During the 1970s, he owned restaurants in Calgary, Alberta, and Saskatoon, Saskatchewan, where he also ran a shiatsu business.

Kamata died on July 23, 2007, in Saskatoon after almost a decade of heart disease.

Championships and accomplishments
50th State Big Time Wrestling
NWA Hawaii Heavyweight Championship (2 times)
NWA North American Heavyweight Championship (Hawaii version) (1 time)
NWA Pacific International Heavyweight Championship (1 time)
All Japan Pro Wrestling
PWF World Heavyweight Championship (1 time)
World's Strongest Tag Determination League Outstanding Performance Award (1978) - with Abdullah the Butcher & The Sheik
American Wrestling Association
AWA World Tag Team Championship (1 time) - with Mitsu Arakawa
Southwest Sports, Inc. / Big Time Wrestling
NWA World Tag Team Championship (6 times) - with Duke Keomuka
Central States Wrestling
NWA North America Tag Team Championship (Central States version)  (1 time) - with Luke Brown
Mid-Atlantic Championship Wrestling
NWA Southern Tag Team Championship (Mid-Atlantic version) (4 times) - with Kinji Shibuya (2) and Duke Keomuka (2)
NWA Los Angeles
NWA "Beat the Champ" Television Championship (3 times)
NWA New Zealand
NWA Australasian Tag Team Championship (3 times) - with Baron Von Krupp (1), Ox Baker (1), and General Hiro (1)
NWA New Zealand British Empire Heavyweight Championship (1 time)
NWA Mid-America
NWA Southern Tag Team Championship (Mid-America version) (1 time) - with Tojo Yamamoto
Stampede Wrestling
NWA International Tag Team Championship (Calgary version) (1 time) - with Sugi Sito
Stampede North American Heavyweight Championship (3 times)
Stampede Wrestling Hall of Fame (Class of 1995)
Western States Alliance
WSA Western States Tag Team Championship (2 times) - with Woody Farmer and Kalalua
World Wrestling Association
WWA World Tag Team Championship (3 times) -  Mitsu Arakawa 
Worldwide Wrestling Associates / NWA Hollywood Wrestling
NWA World Tag Team Championship (Los Angeles version) (1 time) - with Kamalamala
WWA World Tag Team Championship (1 time) - with Freddie Blassie
NWA International Television Tag Team Championship (5 times) - with Hans Hermann (1), Freddie Blassie (2), Bearcat Wright (1) and Kintaro Ohki (1)
World Wrestling Council
WWC Puerto Rico Heavyweight Championship (1 time)

References

External links
 Article acknowledging Tor's death
 
 

1937 births
2007 deaths
American male professional wrestlers
Faux Japanese professional wrestlers
Professional wrestlers from Hawaii
Stampede Wrestling alumni
20th-century professional wrestlers
NWA "Beat the Champ" Television Champions
Stampede Wrestling International Tag Team Champions
Stampede Wrestling North American Heavyweight Champions
NWA Americas Tag Team Champions
PWF World Heavyweight Champions